The Changes is a British children's science fiction television serial filmed in 1974 and first broadcast in 1975 by the BBC. It was directed by John Prowse and is based on the trilogy written by Peter Dickinson: The Weathermonger (1968), Heartsease (1969), and The Devil's Children (1970) (the books were written in reverse order: the events of The Devil's Children happen first, Heartsease second, and The Weathermonger third).

Background
The Changes posits a Britain where a sudden enveloping noise emanating from all machinery and technology causes the population to destroy them.  The resulting upheaval displaces many people and reverts society to a pre-industrial age where there is a deep suspicion of anyone who may be harbouring machinery.  Even the words for technology are taboo.  The remnants of modern technology that escape destruction (such as electricity pylons) produce a physical and sometimes violent repulsion among those left in Britain.

The Changes are seen through the eyes of teenage schoolgirl Nicky Gore (Victoria Williams), and the 10-part series, originally broadcast every Monday from 6 January to 10 March 1975, traces Nicky's quest to reunite with her parents and solve the mystery.

Regular cast
 Vicky Williams as Nicky Gore (all episodes)
 Keith Ashton as Jonathon (episodes 5-10)
 David Garfield as Davy Gordon (episodes 5-8)
 Rafiq Anwar as Chacha (episodes 2-5)
 Zuleika Robson as Margaret (episodes 5-8)
 Raghbir Brar as Gopal (episodes 2-5)
 Sahab Qizilbash as Grandmother (episodes 2-5)
 Marc Zuber as Kewal (episodes 2-5)
 Rebecca Mascarenhas as Ajeet (episodes 2-5)
 Jack Watson as Peter (episodes 5-8)

Production notes
Despite its modest budget, The Changes had extensive location filming. This included:
 Bristol: Clifton; Hotwells; Totterdown
 Weston-super-Mare: Anchor Head
 Berkshire: Stanford Dingley; Bothampstead; Winterbourne
 Gloucestershire: Miserden; Gloucester and Sharpness Canal (incl. Splatt swing bridge and Purton Locks); Sapperton (Daneway Inn); Forest of Dean (Bixslade Valley and Clearwell Caves).

The theme and incidental music, composed by Paddy Kingsland, combines the sound of an EMS Synthi 100 synthesiser with a small live band (horn, sitar and percussion). Kingsland went on to score both the radio and TV adaptations of The Hitchhiker's Guide to the Galaxy and incidental music for a number of Doctor Who stories in the early 1980s.

Described by BBC continuity as "a serial for older children", the TV series was freely adapted by Anna Home from a trilogy of novels by Peter Dickinson. The series took most of its material from The Weathermonger which, together with Heartsease and The Devil's Children has recently been reissued in a single volume in the UK. In the original books, however, the lead character of Nicky Gore appears only in The Devil's Children – the books have entirely separate characters, and Nicky is introduced into scenarios in which she does not appear in the books, mixing with characters from the other two books. In addition, the timespan of The Changes is considerably reduced from that of the original trilogy.

The series was shown overseas, repeated by the BBC in 1976 and on UK Gold in 1994.  It was released on DVD by the BFI in August 2014.

Episode guide

Note: Episode titles were given in Radio Times, but were not shown on-screen.

Soundtrack

A selection of music from this serial was released as a single by BBC Records (RESL 33) in 1976.

The complete soundtrack by Paddy Kingsland was released on double white vinyl LP on 21 April 2018 for Record Store Day 2018.

It was reissued as a bonus disc in the Record Store Day exclusive 6-CD box set Four Albums 1968 – 1978 29 August 2020.

Track listing

References

External links
 
Issue 22 of Skonnos, a TV fanzine special issue on the series from 1996, with interviews (via archive.org).
Little Gems minisite with screencaps episode-by-episode

1975 British television series debuts
1975 British television series endings
1970s British children's television series
BBC children's television shows
British science fiction television shows
Post-apocalyptic television series
English-language television shows
1970s British science fiction television series